Chameleons of the White Shadow is a studio album by Australian, multi-instrumentalist and oud virtuoso Joseph Tawadros. The album was self-released in February 2013.

At the ARIA Music Awards of 2013, the album won the ARIA Award for Best World Music Album.

Reception
Sydney Morning Herald said "With the inclusion of renowned banjo player Bela Fleck, the gifted Hammond organ playing of Joey DeFrancesco and Richard Bona’s bass – the result is a successful interplay, and often joyous push-pull between elements. Displaying his now-legendary skills as an oud player – diving in and out of heroic, Slash-like burning of the strings – the album creates racy, athletic soundscapes and romantic, mystic, spacious dells."

Track listing
 "White Shadow" - 5:58
 "Gypo Blues" - 4:23
 "Rose in the Sky" - 3:53
 "Chameleon" - 5:47
 "Hidden Voices" - 2:17
 "Street in Sarajevo" - 4:02
 "Freo" - 6:19
 "Shelter" - 7:14
 "Variations On a Dream" - 4:44
 "Last Embrace" - 3:49
 "Café Riche" - 8:19
 "Tribal Bendir" - 4:19
 "Time As Place" - 4:17
 "Broken Promises" - 4:35

Personnel
 Joseph Tawadros (Oud)
 Béla Fleck (Banjo), 
 Richard Bona (Electric Bass)
 Joey DeFrancesco (Hammond Organ)
 James Tawadros (Req’ & Bendir)
 Roy Ayers (Vibraphone)
 Howard Johnson (Tuba)
 Jean-Louis Matinier (Accordion)

References 

2013 albums
Joseph Tawadros albums
ARIA Award-winning albums